Gong Li (Chinese: 巩俐; born 31 December 1965) is a Chinese actress. She starred in three of the four Chinese-language films that have been nominated for the Academy Award for Best International Feature Film.

Gong was born in Shenyang, Liaoning, and grew up in Jinan, Shandong. She enrolled at the Central Academy of Drama in Beijing, from where she graduated in 1989. While a student at the Academy, she was spotted by director Zhang Yimou and debuted in Zhang's Red Sorghum in 1987. Gong and Zhang's professional and personal relationship received much media attention in the Chinese-speaking world, as they continued to collaborate on a string of critically acclaimed movies, including the Oscar-nominated features Ju Dou (1990) and Raise the Red Lantern (1991). For her role in the Zhang-directed The Story of Qiu Ju (1992), Gong won the Volpi Cup for Best Actress at the Venice Film Festival.

Gong also starred in the Chen Kaige-directed Oscar-nominated Farewell My Concubine (1993), for which she won Best Supporting Actress at the New York Film Critics Circle Awards. In English-language films, she won the National Board of Review Award for Best Supporting Actress for Memoirs of a Geisha (2005), directed by Rob Marshall. Other notable appearances include Flirting Scholar (1993), To Live (1994), Chinese Box (1997), The Emperor and the Assassin (1998), Breaking the Silence (2000), Zhou Yu's Train (2003), 2046 (2004), Miami Vice (2006), Curse of the Golden Flower (2006), and Coming Home (2014).

Gong was head of jury at the 2000 Berlin Film Festival and the 2002 Venice Film Festival, the first Asian person to hold such position at both events. Over the course of her career, Gong has won three Hundred Flowers Awards, two Golden Rooster Awards, a Hong Kong Film Award, and honorary awards at the Berlin and Cannes film festivals. She was appointed as a Commander (Commandeur) of the Ordre des Arts et des Lettres by the government of France in 2010.

Early life
Gong Li was born in Shenyang, Liaoning, China, the youngest of five children. Her father was a professor of economics and her mother was a teacher. She grew up in Jinan, the capital of Shandong. She has been fond of singing and dancing since childhood, and dreamt of becoming a singer.

She studied in Jinan Sanhe Street Primary School. When she was in grade two, she was recommended by the school to sing children's songs at Jinan People's Broadcasting Station. In Jinan No.2 Middle School, Gong spent six years in high school, when she was a member of the school's literature and art team.

In 1985, she was accepted to study at the Central Academy of Drama in Beijing; she graduated in 1989. While a student at the Central Academy of Drama, she was discovered by Zhang Yimou, who chose her for the lead role in Red Sorghum, his first film as a director.

Acting career

1987–1989: Career beginnings
In 1987, Gong was first chosen by director Zhang Yimou to act in the anti-Japanese war romance Red Sorghum, which officially launched her 15-year cooperation with the China's fifth-generation directors. The film won the Golden Bear at the 38th Berlin International Film Festival, becoming the first Chinese film to win this award. It also won the Golden Rooster Awards and the Hundred Flowers Awards for Best Picture in 1988.

In 1989, Gong starred in Zhang Yimou’s second counterterrorism film, Codename Cougar, for which she won the Hundred Flowers Awards for Best Supporting Actress, ushering in a new stage of exploring acting skills and style.

1990–1999: Fifth generation filmmakers and international spotlight

Over the several years following her 1987 acting debut in Red Sorghum, Gong received international acclaim for her roles in several more Zhang Yimou films.

In 1990, Gong Continued to cooperate with Zhang Yimou and starred in his family ethics movie Ju Dou, which won the Luis Buñuel Special Award at the 1990 Cannes Film Festival and was nominated for the Best Foreign Language Film at the 63rd Academy Awards, becoming the first Chinese film to be nominated for an Academy Award for Best Foreign Language Film. Gong also won the Best Actress award at the Varna International Film Festival.

In 1991, Gong starred in Zhang Yimou's representative film Raise the Red Lantern, which won the Silver Lion award at the 48th Venice Film Festival and was nominated for the Best Foreign Language Film at the 64th Academy Awards. Gong, playing a rebellious mistress in the film, won the Hundred Flowers Awards for Best Actress and was nominated for the David di Donatello Awards and the NSFC for Best Actress. Her performance in the Raise the Red Lantern (1991) put her in the international spotlight again.

In 1992, Gong starred in the rural drama The Story of Qiu Ju, which won the Golden Lion award at the 49th Venice International Film Festival. Gong's portrayal of rural woman Qiu Ju not only won the Golden Rooster Awards and the Japanese Movie Critics Awards for Best Actress, but also helped her named Best Actress at the 49th Venice Film Festival.

In 1993, she received a New York Film Critics Circle award for her role in Farewell My Concubine (1993). Directed by Chen Kaige, the film was her first major role with a director other than Zhang Yimou. In the same year, she was awarded with the Berlinale Camera at the 43rd Berlin International Film Festival. Premiere magazine ranked her performance in Farewell My Concubine as the 89th greatest performance of all time. She also worked with renowned director Stephen Chow in comedy films God of Gamblers III: Back to Shanghai (1991) and Flirting Scholar (1993).

Immune to political repercussions because of her fame, Gong Li began criticizing the censorship policy in China. Her films Farewell My Concubine and The Story of Qiu Ju were initially banned in China for being thinly-veiled critiques of the Chinese government. Regarding the sexual content in Ju Dou, Chinese censorship deemed the film "a bad influence on the physical and spiritual health of young people."

In 1994, Gong played Jia Zhen, the wife of Xu Fugui, in the drama "To Live" with Zhang Yimou, which won the Grand Prix at the 1994 Cannes Film Festival. She was also nominated for the Chlotrudis Awards for Best Actress.

In 1995, Gong starred in Shanghai Triad, her breakup with Zhang Yimou, in which she played a seductive stage queen. The film won the Technical Grand Prize of Cannes Film Festival, the National Board of Review for Best Foreign Language film, and was nominated for the Golden Globe Award for Best Foreign Language Film.

These roles established her reputation, according to Asiaweek, as 

In 1996, Gong and Chen Kaige collaborated again in the romantic film Temptress Moon, which was in competition for the Palme d'Or of the 1996 Cannes Film Festival. Gong has been nominated for her second best Actress at the Hong Kong Film Awards for her role as rebellious teenage girl Ru Yi. She also appeared on the cover of Time magazine(1996).

In 1997, Gong worked with Jeremy Irons on the romantic drama Chinese Box, which won the Best Original Music award at the Venice Film Festival. In the same year, Gong was invited to be a jury at the 1997 Cannes Film Festival, becoming the first Chinese to be a jury at the festival.

In June 1998, Gong Li became a recipient of France's Ordre des Arts et des Lettres.

In 1999, Gong and Chen Kaige collaborated for the third film The Emperor and the Assassin, which won the Technical Grand Prize at the 1999 Cannes Film Festival.

In many of her early movies, Gong represents a tragic victim and an abused soul (physically or emotionally), trying to release herself from an impossible maze of corruption, violence and suppression. In Raise the Red Lantern and Shanghai Triad (1995) an additional tragic element is added to her being as she unintentionally becomes the executioner of new innocent victims, making her realize that she has assisted the dark cynical system.

2000–2004: Worldwide recognition
In 2000, Gong won her second international Best Actress trophy for her performance as a struggling single mother in Breaking the Silence (2000) at the Montreal World Film Festival, directed by Sun Zhou. She attended the Montreal World Film Festival that year, where she was awarded a special Grand Prix of the Americas for lifetime achievement for her outstanding achievement. In the same year, Gong was invited by the Berlin Film Festival to be the president of its international jury for the festival's 50th anniversary.

Gong was invited to head the jury of the Venice Film Festival in 2002.

In 2003, Gong heads review committee of Tokyo Film Festival.

In the early 2000s, Gong also starred in two films directed by Wong Kar-wai, 2046 and Eros (both in 2004), which were seen as "an important opportunity to get rid of the influence of Zhang Yimou". She also attended the 2004 Cannes Film Festival, where she was awarded the Festival Trophy for her contributions to film.

2005–2018: Hollywood and Chinese cinema

Despite her popularity, Gong avoided Hollywood for years, due to a lack of confidence in speaking English. She made her English speaking debut in 2005 when she starred as Hatsumomo in Memoirs of a Geisha. Her performance was met with generally positive reviews. Time Magazine's Richard Corliss to describe her as  Gong also won the National Board of Review for Best Supporting Actress for her role as Hatsumomo. Her other English-language roles to date included the Chinese Cuban Isabella of Miami Vice in 2006 and Lady Murasaki of Hannibal Rising in 2007. In all three films, she learned her English lines phonetically.

Through three English-language films, Gong has gradually established herself in Hollywood. Speaking of the Hollywood experience, Gong said it broadened her horizons, gave her a better idea of what she liked and allowed her to experiment with different acting styles.

In 2006, Gong worked again with Zhang Yimou for historical epic Curse of the Golden Flower, for which She won the best Actress at the 26th Hong Kong Film Awards. Time named her performance as the Empress as the 7th greatest performance of the year.

She narrated Beijing (2008), an audio walking tour by Louis Vuitton and Soundwalk, which won an Audie Award for Best Original Work in 2009.

In 2010, Gong starred in the World War II-era thriller Shanghai as a spy who is disguised as the wife of a triad boss (played by Chow Yun-fat). She turned to documentaries and photographs about World War II, besides taking dancing classes three times a week, to ensure an accurate portrayal of the character. During a press junket for the film, she stated that she was becoming more selective with the Chinese language projects offered to her.

She also emphasized in the interview: 

In 2014, Gong was the president of the jury for the 17th Shanghai International Film Festival. Later that same year, she reunited with Zhang Yimou for the film Coming Home, which is set during the throes of the Cultural Revolution; this film was their first collaboration since 2006.

In 2016, Gong took on her first action role in The Monkey King 2, playing the White Bone Demon.

In 2018, Gong served as the jury president of 55th Golden Horse Awards.

2019–present: Global comeback and return to the screen
In 2019, Gong was cast in Lou Ye's period drama Saturday Fiction, where she plays an actress who is working undercover gathering intelligence for the Allies. The film was selected to compete for the Golden Lion at the 76th Venice International Film Festival. Gong learned shooting and hypnosis for the spy film. Her performance gained rave reviews. That year, she was also cast in the live-action adaptation of the 1998 Disney animated film Mulan, as a powerful witch. While the film, released in 2020, had a mixed reception, Gong's performance was widely praised by critics. The Vanity Fair's chief critic, Richard Lawson, wrote in his review, "It is a pleasure as ever to watch Gong do her thing, slinking and thrashing around in a fabulous black witch’s cloak."
 
The Hollywood Reporter commented: 

In 2020, Gong was cast in Peter Chan's biographical film Leap, where she plays the hard-driving, real-life head coach of the Chinese women’s national volleyball team Lang Ping.

In 2021, Gong was invited to be the jury president of the 11th Beijing International Film Festival, becoming the first female jury president in the history of the festival.

Personal life
Her personal and professional relationship with director Zhang Yimou has been highly publicized. The pair collaborated on six films between 1987 and 1995, before ending their relationship. They reunited in 2006 for the film Curse of the Golden Flower and in 2014 on Coming Home.

In November 1996, Gong married Singaporean tobacco tycoon Ooi Hoe Seong at Hong Kong's China Club.
But the couple were rarely seen in public and it is not known whether they had any children.

Gong was nominated Goodwill Ambassador of the Food and Agriculture Organization of the United Nations (FAO) on 16 October 2000.

In 2006, she was voted the most beautiful woman in China.

Gong applied for Singapore citizenship in early 2008. When overseas professional obligations prevented her from showing up at her scheduled August citizenship ceremony, she was harshly criticized for not making it a priority. On Saturday, 8 November 2008, Gong, in an effort to make amends, attended a citizenship ceremony held at Teck Ghee Community Club and received her Singapore citizenship certificate from Member of Parliament Lee Bee Wah. Gong was reportedly considering renouncing Singapore citizenship after being blacklisted in China.

In 2010, Gong Li and her husband Ooi were divorced.

In 2019, Gong Li married French composer Jean-Michel Jarre.

Filmography

Films

Dubbing

Talk show

Music video

Discography

Endorsements
Gong is the first Chinese ambassador for L'Oreal Paris in 1997. She also served as ambassador for Midea, Chopard and Osim International.

From 2013 to 2018, Gong served as the global ambassadors for Piaget.

Gong served as the global brand ambassador for Hisense on September 27, 2020.

Since 2021, Gong has been the first Chinese artist to become the global high jewelry ambassador for Cartier.

Charities 
 Gong was appointed UNESCO Artist for Peace in 2000.
 Gong was appointed FAO Goodwill Ambassador on World Food Day 2000. "To launch an appeal against hunger is not a waste of time.
 Gong has been invited by the United Nations Environment Program (UNEP) to be Global Environmental Ambassador, and to urge the public to give up bad habits that are harmful to the environment and to reduce the discharge of carbon dioxide in 2008.
 Gong Li's Portrait on display at "The Transformative Power of Art" Exhibition, at the United Nations headquarters in 2016.

Awards and nominations

Jury
1997 – 50th Cannes Film Festival
2000 – 50th Berlin International Film Festival
2002 – 59th Venice Film Festival
2003 – 16th Tokyo International Film Festival
2014 – 17th Shanghai International Film Festival
2018 – 55th Golden Horse Film Festival and Awards
2021 – 11th Beijing International Film Festival

See also
 Cinema of China

References

External links

 
 Gong Li  Video produced by Makers: Women Who Make America

1965 births
Living people
20th-century Chinese actresses
21st-century Chinese actresses
21st-century Singaporean actresses
Actresses from Shenyang
Central Academy of Drama alumni
Chinese emigrants to Singapore
Chinese film actresses
FAO Goodwill ambassadors
People who lost Chinese citizenship
Naturalised citizens of Singapore
Singaporean film actresses
Volpi Cup for Best Actress winners
Commandeurs of the Ordre des Arts et des Lettres